Cariniana pyriformis (known as Colombian mahogany or abarco) is a species of woody plant in the family Lecythidaceae.
It is found in Brazil, Colombia, Costa Rica, and Venezuela. It is threatened by habitat loss.

References

External links
 

pyriformis
Neotropical realm flora
Near threatened plants
Taxonomy articles created by Polbot